Enteromius loveridgii is a species of ray-finned fish in the  family Cyprinidae.
It is found only in Kenya.
Its natural habitat is rivers. Its status is insufficiently known.

References

Sources

Enteromius
Taxa named by George Albert Boulenger
Fish described in 1916
Taxonomy articles created by Polbot